Conjoined paw may refer to any of the following:

Animals
Cloven paw
Cloven hoof

Music
Cloven Hoof (band)